The Waterdogs Lacrosse Club is a professional men's field lacrosse team in the Premier Lacrosse League (PLL). The Waterdogs are the first PLL expansion team set to play in the 2020 season. Players were selected through an expansion draft, new entry draft, and the college draft over the first few months of 2020. Andy Copelan was announced as the Club's first head coach on January 2, 2020.  Owners of the club include Pardon My Take hosts, Barstool Big Cat & PFT Commenter. The Waterdogs won their first championship in 2022 against The Chaos.

Roster

*Indicates member of "Unavailable to travel" list

**Indicates player is on PUP list

(C) indicates captain

Source:

2020 Expansion Draft

Source:

Coaching staff 

 Head coach – Andy Copelan
 Assistant coach – Robert Cross
 Assistant coach – Brendan Dawson

Player Pool 
On March 21, Waterdogs announced they had signed the following players from the player pool:

Source:

All time Draft Selections 

2020 Entry Draft

The 2020 player entry draft occurred on March 16 for teams to select players arriving from rival Major League Lacrosse. On March 4, Paul Burmeister and NBCSN hosted an entry draft lottery for selection order. Out of 100 balls to select from, Waterdogs had 40, Chrome had 25, Atlas had 15, Archers had 10, Chaos had 6, Redwoods had 3, and the champion Whipsnakes had 1.

Rob Pannell was announced to be transferring to the PLL on March 9, followed by 15 other players the following day, which comprised the selection pool for the entry draft. A total of 14 players were selected in the entry draft with remaining new players entering the league player pool.

2020 College Draft

2021 Entry Draft

2021 College Draft

2022 College Draft

Season results

PLL Award Winners 
Gait Brothers Midfielder of the Year
 Zach Currier: 2021
Dick Edell Coach of the Year
 Andy Copelan: 2021

Head coaches

All-time record vs. PLL Clubs

References

Premier Lacrosse League teams
Lacrosse clubs established in 2020